Ida Ella Marie Ekeroth Clausson (born 1991) is a Swedish politician and member of the Riksdag, the national legislature. A member of the Social Democratic Party, she has represented Västra Götaland County East since September 2022. She had previously been a substitute member of the Riksdag for Urban Ahlin between October 2015 and December 2015.

References

1991 births
Living people
Members of the Riksdag 2022–2026
Members of the Riksdag from the Social Democrats
Women members of the Riksdag
21st-century Swedish women politicians